Nitro Records was an American independent record label, founded in 1994 and operated by The Offspring's Dexter Holland and Greg K. Nitro is famous for being an incubator for punk rock artists who have subsequently become successful, most notably AFI. The label has also released albums from classic punk bands, including The Damned and T.S.O.L.

In July 2013, Bicycle Music acquired Nitro Records.

Past Artists
 30 Foot Fall
 AFI
 The Aquabats
 A Wilhelm Scream
 Bodyjar
 Bullet Train to Vegas
 Crime in Stereo
 The Damned
  Divit
 Don't Look Down
 Enemy You
 Ensign
 Exene Cervenka and the Original Sinners
 Guttermouth
 Hit The Switch
 Jughead's Revenge
 The Letters Organize
 Lost City Angels
 Much The Same
 No Trigger
 The Offspring (re-releasing old material)
 One Hit Wonder
 Rufio
 Sloppy Seconds
 Son of Sam
 TheStart
 Stavesacre
 T.S.O.L.
 The Turbo A.C.'s
 Up Syndrome
 The Vandals

Compilations
1996 – Go Ahead Punk... Make My Day
1998 – Deep Thoughts
2000 – The Thought Remains the Same (re-issue of Deep Thoughts)
2001 – Punkzilla

References

External links
 Official site
 

American independent record labels
Record labels established in 1994
Punk record labels
Horror punk record labels
Companies based in Huntington Beach, California